T. J. Jackson may refer to:
 T. J. Jackson (wide receiver) (1943–2007), American football wide receiver
 T. J. Jackson (singer) (born 1978), American singer and member of 3T
 T. J. Jackson (defensive tackle) (born 1983), American football defensive tackle
 Thomas Jonathan Jackson, more commonly known as Stonewall Jackson

See also
 T. J. Jackson Lears (born 1947), American historian